Topki is a town in Kemerovo Oblast, Russia, located  west of Kemerovo, the administrative center of the oblast. Population:

History
It was founded in 1914 due to the construction of the Trans-Siberian Railway. The Topki railway station was opened in 1916. It was granted town status in 1933.

Administrative and municipal status
Within the framework of administrative divisions, Topki serves as the administrative center of Topkinsky District, even though is not a part of it. As an administrative division, it is incorporated separately as Topki Town Under Oblast Jurisdiction—an administrative unit with a status equal to that of the districts. As a municipal division, Topki Town Under Oblast Jurisdiction is incorporated within Topkinsky Municipal District as Topkinskoye Urban Settlement.

References

Notes

Sources

External links
 Official website of Topki
 Unofficial website of Topki

Cities and towns in Kemerovo Oblast